General Lindemann may refer to:

Fritz Lindemann (1894–1944), German Wehrmacht general of the artillery
Georg Lindemann (1884–1963), German Wehrmacht colonel general
Gerhard Lindemann (1896–1994), German Wehrmacht major general